, professionally known by the mononym  is a Japanese fashion model and television personality. She is the elder sister of Alan Shirahama, a member of the all-male J-pop groups Generations from Exile Tribe and Exile.

Biography
Loveli was born as Izumi Shirahama on November 27, 1989, in Matsuyama, Ehime, to a Filipino mother and Japanese father. She started her career as reporter working for Fuji TV in 2010. She also worked as a yoga instructor. She later worked as a weather forecaster for Nippon Television, before becoming a model for JJ magazine in 2013.

References

External links
  
 Agency profile  
  

1989 births
Japanese female models
Japanese television personalities
Japanese people of Filipino descent
People from Matsuyama, Ehime
Living people